The Affairs of Cellini is a 1934 comedy film directed by Gregory La Cava and starring Frank Morgan, Constance Bennett, Fredric March, Fay Wray, and Louis Calhern. It is set in Florence. The film was adapted by Bess Meredyth from the play The Firebrand of Florence by Edwin Justus Mayer.

Plot
Both the duke and duchess have an eye for beauty and other partners. The duke presently fancies a young woman who poses as an artist's model. The duchess has her eye on the famous artist, Benvenuto Cellini, who is in the palace making a set of gold plates to be used at ducal banquets. Cellini purportedly hypnotizes young women, and cuckolds the duke of Florence. The somewhat oblivious duke is loath to punish the young man because Cellini fashions gold wares for him, but throws him into the torture chamber. However, a goblet of poisoned wine solves the problem.

Cast
 Constance Bennett as Duchess of Florence
 Fredric March as Benvenuto Cellini
 Frank Morgan as Alessandro, Duke of Florence
 Fay Wray as Angela
 Vince Barnett as Ascanio
 Jessie Ralph as Beatrice
 Louis Calhern as Ottaviano
 Jay Eaton as Polverino
 Paul Harvey as Emissary
 Jack Rutherford as Captain of the Guards
 Irene Ware as Daughter of the Royal House of Bocci

Reception
Morgan was nominated for the Academy Award for Best Actor. It was also nominated for Best Art Direction, Best Cinematography and Best Sound, Recording (Thomas T. Moulton).

The film was a box-office disappointment for United Artists.

The film would later be discussed on the seventh episode of The Snub Club where it was heavily criticized.

MPPDA/MPAA production code of 1934 to 1968
During production and distribution of the movie, MPPDA's production code took effect on every major film studio like Warner Bros. or the Walt Disney Productions. Fox Film Corporation. had the first film with the MPPDA production code era with The World Moves On, released on June 28, 1934.

References

External links
 

1934 films
1934 comedy films
Twentieth Century Pictures films
United Artists films
American black-and-white films
Films set in the 16th century
American comedy films
Films scored by Alfred Newman
Films directed by Gregory La Cava
Films set in Florence
Biographical films about artists
Films with screenplays by Bess Meredyth
American films based on plays
Cultural depictions of Benvenuto Cellini
1930s English-language films
1930s American films